ʻEwa was one of the original districts known as moku, of the island of Oʻahu in Ancient Hawaii history.

The word ʻewa means "crooked" or "ill-fitting" in Hawaiian. The name comes from the myth that the gods Kāne and Kanaloa threw a stone to determine the boundaries, but it was lost and later found at Pili o Kahe.

ʻEwa is used in Honolulu to indicate the West direction, in opposition to Diamond Head for the East direction.

See also
Ewa Villages, Hawaii
ʻEwa Gentry, Hawaii
ʻEwa Beach, Hawaii

References

Geography of Oahu